Rangrazan may refer to:

Rangrazan-e Olya
Rangrazan-e Sofla
Rangrazan-e Vosta